Lalahluy-e Torab (also Romanized as Lalahlūy-e Torāb; also known as Lalahlū-ye Torāb, Lalalū-ye Ātlū Khān, and Lalaryelūy-e Torāb) is a village in Nazlu-e Shomali Rural District, Nazlu District, Urmia County, West Azerbaijan Province, Iran. At the 2006 census, its population was 295, in 77 families.

References 

Populated places in Urmia County